The boys' 48 kg  competition in taekwondo at the 2010 Summer Youth Olympics in Singapore took place on August 15. A total of 8 men competed in this event, limited to fighters whose body weight was less than 48 kilograms. Quarterfinals started at 14:32, semifinals at 19:02 and the final at 20:09. Two bronze medals were awarded at the Taekwondo competitions.

Medalists

Results
Legend
PTG — Won by Points Gap
SUP — Won by Superiority
OT — Won on over time (Golden Point)
WDR — Withdrew

Main bracket

References
 Draw

Taekwondo at the 2010 Summer Youth Olympics